Joseph Coriaty, FAIA, (born June 26, 1956) is an American architect.

Early life and education

Son of Joseph Said Coriaty and Therese Elaine Coriaty, Joseph Coriaty is one of six siblings. He was born in Detroit, Michigan, and spent his childhood in Riverview, Michigan, until 1965, when the Coriaty family moved to Trenton, Michigan.  He attended Trenton High School, graduating in 1974.

Coriaty received his Bachelor of Science degree in architecture from the University of Detroit in 1978, where he graduated magna cum laude. Coriaty went on to receive his Master of Architecture degree from the University of Southern California in 1980. He has been a registered architect in the State of California since 1983.

Professional career 

After Coriaty earned his Master of Architecture degree from the University of Southern California in 1980, he spent the early part of his professional career at John Siebel Associate Architects in Los Angeles, California, John Carl Warnecke & Associates in Los Angeles, and Widom/Wein & Partners in Santa Monica, California.  In 1983, Coriaty joined The Landau Partnership in Santa Monica, California, where he worked as the project architect on a number of notable projects, such as Central Park at Toluca Lake in Burbank, California, and The Biltmore Tower at the Los Angeles Biltmore Hotel in downtown Los Angeles.

Coriaty joined Frederick Fisher and Partners in 1988, and became a partner in 1995.  He is currently the partner-in-charge for Frederick Fisher and Partners' academic, civic, live-work and community-oriented projects. His focus is the design of the firm's large-scale signature academic, library, institutional, and museum projects. Coriaty's strong interest in the process of making is founded in his early years spent in Detroit, a leading car-manufacturing city. His projects share a common ethos – one that balances program, beauty, efficiency, and community.

Key projects include, but are not limited to: Santa Monica City Hall East, in Santa Monica, CA, Firestone Library at Princeton University; Seaver Science Center (Library) at the University of Southern California; the Annenberg Center for Information Science and Technology at Caltech in Pasadena, California; Phase III of the Campus Expansion initiative at Otis College of Art and Design in Los Angeles; The Annenberg Community Beach House in Santa Monica; Colby College Museum of Art in Waterville, Maine; Bergamot Station Arts Complex and Redevelopment in Santa Monica; MoMA PS1 in Queens, New York; numerous Houston's Restaurants nationwide; Flint Institute of Arts in Flint, Michigan; and, the Science Education and Research Facility for Crossroads School in Santa Monica.
       

Coriaty's long-spanning accomplishments as a design leader and visionary architect were recognized in 2022 when he was honored by Craft Contemporary Museum in Los Angeles and in 2021 when he received the Spirit of Detroit Mercy Alumni Achievement Award. Other notable awards attributed to projects that Coriaty was the partner-in-charge, designer, and/or project director include, but are not limited to: Top Prize for Excellence in Restaurant Design from the American Institute of Architecture, Los Angeles Chapter for the Santa Monica Houston's Restaurant project; the Westside Prize, Honor Award in Public Institutional Projects from the Westside Urban Forum for the Annenberg Community Beach House, and Design Merit Award from the Westside Urban Forum for the Annenberg Center for Information Science and Technology at Caltech.

Coriaty is on the Deans Board of Advisors at the University of Detroit Mercy, a Trustee of The Craft Contemporary Museum in Los Angeles, a Fellow on The American Institute of Architects, and a member of the following organizations: USC Architecture Guild, Society of College & University Planners, and the Southern California Development Forum.

Design philosophy 

The design of academic and museum spaces constitute a significant portion of Coriaty's portfolio.  He is quoted saying that he likes "the idea of researchers and visitors alike enjoying their work in a natural setting."  Regarding his work on Princeton's Firestone Library, home to over 5,000,000 volumes, he explained, "the idea is to embrace the existing building and expand the ethos as a 'laboratory of learning'." Across the country in Pasadena, California, The Walter Annenberg Center for Information Science and Technology, at the California Institute of Technology in Pasadena, "was designed to be more than a classroom—it was intended to be an experimental learning center," Coriaty said. "As a Gold LEED certified structure, its use of natural light minimized electricity, and the idea is to bring nature in, blending space and light. Here, the introspective turns outward." So popular is the building, according to Coriaty, that researchers have a waiting list to work in the building, and classes are more popular than ever. "Natural light and air help create a pleasant environment," he said. "A pleasant environment helps researchers and students enjoy their work and thus inspire natural collaboration."

Many of the recent public and institutional projects that Coriaty and his colleagues at Frederick Fisher and Partners have designed, including projects at Caltech as well as the Annenberg Community Beach House at Santa Monica State Beach, share many of the hallmarks of modern architecture: the clean lines, the boxy, glass-wrapped volumes, the disdain for literal historical ornament. They also show a decided interest in Minimalism, paying as much attention to the spaces between buildings as to the buildings themselves.

Other projects include the Colby College Art Museum in Waterville, Maine, where an enormous artistic bequest necessitated an addition to an existing exhibition space. Despite this prodigious output, Coriaty is quick to single out his colleagues. "Architecture is a team sport," he said. "I have my partners and many people behind me who help me do what I do."
Coriaty traveled to Haiti with members of the Jesuit Refugee Service in an effort to evaluate the damaged school buildings. His knowledge of both architectural design, and structural systems provided a teaching opportunity to educate the local Haitian engineers, and builders in structurally sound design. The experience intrinsically informed him on the importance of balancing form and function in the creation of communities.

Personal life 

In 1978, Coriaty moved from Detroit to Santa Monica, California, where he has remained to date.  He married Ann Marie Fredal on December 28, 1983, in Detroit, Michigan.  Together, they have two children.  His personal interests include collecting art, collecting various forms of musical recordings, fine watches, and unique items that are design-oriented.

References

1956 births
20th-century American architects
University of Detroit Mercy alumni
USC School of Architecture alumni
Living people